Carlos Santiago Fayt (1 February 1918 – 22 November 2016) was an Argentine lawyer, politician, academic and a member of the Supreme Court of Justice of Argentina from 1983 to 2015.

Early life and career
Fayt was born in 1918 in Salta, but his family was from Tartagal. His father, Emilio Moisés Fayt, was an Arab Christian of Syrian and Lebanese descent and his mother, Sara Pérez Robles, was of criollo background. At a young age he moved to Buenos Aires. He graduated as a lawyer in 1941 from the University of Buenos Aires (UBA). He played an active role in trade union life, heading the Buenos Aires Lawyers' Association 1963–1965, and had an extensive academic career. Fayt taught at UBA and at the National University of La Plata, specialising in political law. He was Emeritus Professor at UBA and taught at Belgrano University during the last years of his life.

He was also an active member of the Socialis Party, and stood to be governor of Salta Province in 1958. A supporter of Nicolás Repetto and Alfredo Palacios, he later became part of the faction of Carlos Sánchez Viamonte. After splits in the Socialist Party, however, he dedicated himself to civic and academic life. Three of his 35 books are on the subject of Peronism.

Career in the Supreme Court
Fayt was appointed to the Supreme Court by the new democratic government of President Raúl Alfonsín in 1983, despite never having served as a judge. In the 1990s, when President Carlos Menem had increased the size of the Court and appointed several sympathetic Justices, Fayt was one of those who generally opposed the majority view. Fayt is the longest serving Supreme Court Justice in Argentina ever. He had previously been approached by President Arturo Illia in the 1960s to join the Supreme Court, but had turned the role down on that occasion. From July 2003 he presided over the court for some months.

In 2008 Konex Foundation from Argentina granted him the Diamond Konex Award for Institutions - Community - Enterprise as the most important community personality in the last decade in his country.

On 15 September 2015, Fayt submitted his resignation from the Supreme Court. The resignation took effect on 11 December 2015, the day after the end of the Presidential administration.

Fayt died on 22 November 2016 at the age of 98.

References

External links

1918 births
2016 deaths
People from Salta
Argentine agnostics
20th-century Argentine judges
Argentine people of Lebanese descent
Argentine people of Syrian descent
Burials at La Recoleta Cemetery
Supreme Court of Argentina justices
Socialist Party (Argentina) politicians
University of Buenos Aires alumni